Manuel Luis Jacinto (born August 19, 1987) is a Canadian actor born in the Philippines. After several small roles on television, his breakout role came starring as Jason Mendoza on the NBC sitcom The Good Place (2016–2020). He has appeared as Waring 'Wade' Espiritu in the neo-noir thriller film Bad Times at the El Royale (2018) and as Fritz in the action drama film Top Gun: Maverick (2022).

Early life
Jacinto was born in Manila, Philippines, and is of Chinese Filipino descent. His family immigrated to Canada in 1990, when he was about three years old. He was raised in Richmond, British Columbia. He grew up playing baseball and basketball, and attended an all-boys Catholic high school, Vancouver College.

He earned a bachelor's degree in civil engineering at the University of British Columbia.

Career
While interning, Jacinto participated in hip-hop dance competitions before deciding on acting as a career. He became frustrated by the lack of other Asian actors in Vancouver and moved to Los Angeles.

After small roles in series including Once Upon a Time, Supernatural and iZombie, he was cast in 2015 as triad leader Wing Lei in the Canadian spy drama The Romeo Section by Chris Haddock. The role won him a Leo Award nomination for Best Supporting Performance in a Dramatic Series.

In 2016, Jacinto was cast as Jianyu Li / Jason Mendoza in the NBC comedy The Good Place. He received favourable reviews for his performance as Mendoza, an EDM-obsessed "lovable doofus" from Jacksonville, Florida, going against stereotypes of how Asian men are often portrayed in Hollywood.

In September 2018, Jacinto was cast in the Top Gun sequel Top Gun: Maverick, starring Tom Cruise.

In November 2019, it was announced that Jacinto would have a main role on the Netflix horror drama miniseries Brand New Cherry Flavor. It was released on August 13, 2021.

In November 2021, it was announced that Jacinto would voice Scott in the animated comedy-adventure series Hailey’s On It!, slated to premiere in 2023.

In 2022, Jacinto voiced Lucan in the eight-episode sci-fi podcast Marigold Breach, alongside his Good Place co-star Jameela Jamil.

Personal life 
In November 2019, Jacinto announced that he was engaged to fellow Canadian actress Dianne Doan. He lives in Los Angeles.

Filmography

Film

Television

Awards and nominations

References

External links
 

Living people
Male actors from Manila
Canadian male actors of Chinese descent
Canadian male actors of Filipino descent
Canadian male television actors
Canadian male voice actors
People from Richmond, British Columbia
Filipino emigrants to Canada
University of British Columbia alumni
21st-century Canadian male actors
1987 births
Canadian male film actors